David Giraldo  is a Colombian footballer. He currently plays as a forward for Millonarios in the Copa Mustang.

External links
Profile at BDFA

1984 births
Living people
Colombian footballers
Once Caldas footballers
Alianza Petrolera players
Sport Club Internacional players
Esporte Clube Noroeste players
Millonarios F.C. players
Colombian expatriate footballers
Expatriate footballers in Brazil
Association football forwards
People from Manizales